Marais des Cygnes Valley USD 456 is a public unified school district headquartered in Melvern, Kansas, United States.  The district includes the communities of Melvern, Olivet, Quenemo, and nearby rural areas.

Administration
Marais des Cygnes Valley USD 456 is currently under the administration of Superintendent Joe Sample.

Board of Education
The USD 456 Board of Education is currently under the leadership of President Greg McCurdy.

Schools
The school district operates the following schools:
 Marais des Cygnes Valley High School in Melvern
 Marais des Cygne Valley Junior High School in Melvern
 Marais des Cygnes Valley Elementary School in Quenemo

See also
 Kansas State Department of Education
 Kansas State High School Activities Association
 List of high schools in Kansas
 List of unified school districts in Kansas

References

External links
 

School districts in Kansas
Education in Osage County, Kansas